Eternal Nightmare may refer to:

 Eternal Nightmare (Vio-lence album)
 Eternal Nightmare (Chelsea Grin album)